Stephanie Rehe was the defending champion but did not compete that year.

Steffi Graf won in the final 6–4, 7–5 against Zina Garrison.

Seeds
A champion seed is indicated in bold text while text in italics indicates the round in which that seed was eliminated.

  Steffi Graf (champion)
  Zina Garrison (final)
  Susan Sloane (first round)
  Patty Fendick (second round)
  Lori McNeil (first round)
  Nathalie Tauziat (semifinals)
  Claudia Kohde-Kilsch (quarterfinals)
  Rosalyn Fairbank (first round)

Draw

References

External links
 1989 Great American Bank Classic draw

Southern California Open
1989 WTA Tour